Bundoran is a town in County Donegal, Ireland. The town is located near the N15 road near Ballyshannon, and is the most southerly town in Donegal. The town is a tourist seaside resort, and tourism has been at the heart of the local economy since the 18th century. Bundoran is a surfing destination and was listed by National Geographic magazine in 2012 as one of the world's top 20 surf towns.

History

Origins
Bundoran, or Bun Dobhráin in Irish (which means the foot of the little water) was, up until over a century ago, two separate villages. Bundoran was the village west of the bridge over the River Bradoge. This area is now called the West End. In between these two separate communities was the townland of Drumacrin. The area of Drumacrin is now part of what is today's town centre. Single Street was where most of the local population lived. It was only after completion of the Enniskillen and Bundoran Railway in 1868, which opened a terminus that it called Bundoran, that the two distinct communities developed and merged to what are today called Bundoran.

The first official record of Bundoran is in a deposition by Hugh Gaskein on 16 May 1653. He was a witness to events during the 1641 Rebellion when he was an apprentice butcher in Sligo. In 1689 a skirmish was fought near Bundoran between a Jacobite force under Sir Connell Ferrall and the retreating Protestant garrison of Sligo.

William Cole, Viscount Enniskillen, built Bundoran Lodge, his summer home, in 1777. This building still stands on Bayview Avenue and is now called Homefield House. The Viscount seems to have started a trend amongst his contemporaries as more of them discovered Bundoran and visited it to enjoy the seaside and what were believed to be its health benefits.

Public Rights of Way
The rights of the people to have access to the seashore were blocked by a local landlord but the locals found a champion in the parish priest Canon Kelaghan who fought through the courts in 1870 to ensure that the pathways and roads to the beach remained open to the public. Canon Kelaghan also had the present Catholic church built in 1859.

The Railway
The opening of the Enniskillen and Bundoran Railway (E&BR) in 1868 connected Bundoran railway station with Ireland's growing railway network and made the town more accessible from Belfast, Dublin and other population centres on the east and north-east coasts of Ireland. The Great Northern Railway (GNR) operated the E&BR line from 1876 and absorbed the company in 1896.

In this period Bundoran emerged as one of Ireland's most popular seaside resorts. By the end of the 19th century it had become one of the main seaside resorts in Ulster. Hotels and lodging houses were opened around the town and the GNR built the Great Northern Hotel, one of Bundoran's best-known landmarks.

During The Emergency of 1939–45 the GNR introduced the Bundoran Express that linked Dublin and Bundoran via  and Enniskillen. It also carried pilgrims to and from Pettigo, which was the nearest station for Lough Derg in County Donegal. There were also through trains between Bundoran and Belfast.

The partition of Ireland in 1922 turned the boundary with County Fermanagh into an international frontier. Henceforth Bundoran's only railway link with the rest of the Irish Free State was via Northern Ireland, and as such was subject to delays for customs inspections. The Government of Northern Ireland closed much of the GNR network on its side of the border in 1957, including the E&BR as far as the border. This gave the Republic no practical alternative but to allow the closure of the line between the border and Bundoran.

Today, the closest railway stations to Bundoran are Sligo Mac Diarmada Station in Sligo Town and Waterside Station in Derry.

Central Hotel fire

On 8 August 1980, a fire broke out at The Central Hotel in the heart of the town. Ten people died as a result, including five children. In September 2008, the Church reinstalled a stained glass window made by the world-renowned Harry Clarke (1889–1931), a window which for many years was lying hidden in the parish house of the local Catholic church. The council also erected a carved stone monument bench on Central Lane (beside The Central Hotel) in August 2010 as a mark of respect listing the names of the ten people who lost their lives.

Attractions

Bundoran Beach

For almost two centuries people have visited Bundoran beach on hot summer days. The tradition of bathing boxes began in Victorian times. They were primarily used by members of the gentry, who were reticent about undressing in public. The boxes were pushed, on wheels, to the water's edge and the customer entered the box through one door, put on their bathing costume and stepped out another door to enter the sea. The box remained there until the bather was finished, dried off and fully clothed again. The bathing box was brought back to its original position on the beach, ready for the next client.

Stationary bathing boxes were introduced in the early 1900s. They proved more amenable and cheaper to the public. In the 1920s, Mrs Elizabeth Travers and her brother-in-law, Bilshie Travers hired the boxes from the local Council. For 3 old pennies a customer hired a bathing costume and for 6 old pennies, they could hire "the whole package" which consisted of a bathing cap, costume and towel. A familiar sight on the beach in the 1950s and 1960s was "The Duck". This was a former British Army amphibious craft that ferried tourists out onto the Bay. Despite being prone to breakdown, it was an attraction at the time.

The Main Beach in Bundoran has been awarded a Blue Flag for each year of the existence of the competition, bar 2019.

Coastal Walks
The Promenade to Tullan Strand Starting at Bundoran Bridge and looking out towards the sea is Cladach Leathan (the broad beach) on which lies Bill Ireland's Stone, named after the rescue of a shipwrecked sailor. Beyond it is the surf break of The Peak. At the end of the Promenade is Carraig na nÉan (the rock of the birds). The pump house that overlooks the bay was built by local landlords the Hamiltons in 1861. Close by is Carraig a Choiscéim (the rock of the step). Next to it is Poll Uain (Lambs' Hole) which is also known as the Horse Pool. The Thrupenny Pool was named after the price of admission (3d. in pre-decimal currency). The main beach is called Trá na Draina (the strand of the strong) where according to legend the giant Culina wrestled with his son, both unaware of each other's identity. The small stream that enters the sea on the beach is Sruthán na Cúil Fhinne (the rivulet of the fair girl). The coral and brachiopod fossils embedded in the rocks of Rougey are over 300 million years old. At the tip of Rougey is Aughrus (the peninsula of the steeds), where the warhorses of Conall Gulbán and the O‘Donnells grazed. Passing by the golf links is Pól Uaine and Pól Tóbí, both fishing spots. Next is the ‘Puffing Hole’. Below is Tullan Strand, where the first inhabitants of the area used flint from the rocks to make tools.

Fairy Bridges & Wishing Chair
The Fairy Bridges and Wishing Chair are located on the Roguey Walk near Tullan Strand in the town. This natural sea arch bridge was said to be Bundoran's first tourism attraction when the town became popular in the late 1700s. It features in a painting by artist Helen Allingham and in 2020 won a TripAdvisor Travellers Choice award placing it in the top 10 attractions on the review site across the globe.

Waterworld
The Waterworld complex opened in 1991 with its development coming about as a result of major storm damage in 1988 along the seafront. The indoor water park includes a wave pool, rapids, slides that were added in 1994 with the addition of an external tower, and a three-lane multi-slide and toddler pool which were added in 2013 as a result of a multi-million euro investment by its owners Donegal County Council.

Adventure World
Adventure World, near Waterworld, includes waltzing horses and water bumper cars, for younger families. A big wheel is used in Galway's Christmas market, where it is located outside the Great Southern Hotel.

Amusement arcades
Macks amusements are owned by a son of Sean McEniff. There are several hundred gaming machines and several dozen amusement machines. At its entrance is a large statue of Neptune.

Hotels, hostels, caravans and campsites
Bundoran has many hotels, among the biggest are The Allingham Arms (132 rooms), The Great Northern (102) and The Holyrood (91). Fitzgerald's Hotel, with 16 rooms, is the town's smallest and first opened in 1941, retaining an atmosphere from the past. As well as hotels, a 2018 report recorded sixteen caravan sites and campsites (consisting of 4,312 beds), several hundred self-catering residences and nine hostels.

Brennan's Criterion Bar

Brennan's Criterion Bar opened in the area in 1900 and shut down in 2018.

Transport

Roads
The opening in April 2006 of the Bundoran/Ballyshannon bypass has made the resort more accessible. The Drowes River, where the southern part of the bypass commences and which separates County Leitrim from County Donegal, is also the demarcation point between the provinces of Connacht to the south and Ulster to the north.

Rail
Bundoran Railway Station opened on 13 June 1866 but finally closed on 1 October 1957. The New Council Offices carpark is where the Bundoran Railway Station once stood.

The nearest railway station is Sligo Mac Diarmada Station in Sligo Town, where trains run to Dublin Connolly and are operated by Iarnród Éireann. Buses from Bundoran to Sligo stop at Sligo bus station which is adjacent to Sligo Mac Diarmada Station.

Coach/bus transport

Bus Éireann buses connect Bundoran to Sligo Mac Diarmada Station in Sligo Town. Bus Éireann also run a regular service, several times a day, from Derry to Galway, via Letterkenny and Bundoran. Feda O'Donnell runs private buses to Sligo from Bundoran as well. It also offers routes to and from Gweedore via Letterkenny, Donegal Town, Ballyshannon and Bundoran to the west of Ireland, including Sligo and Galway. There is also a regular bus service from Bundoran to Enniskillen.

Local Link serves the town on two services - 982 Ballyshannon to Sligo and 983 Kinlough to Ballyshannon.

There are a number of bus stops in the town, though the main ones are the East bus stop and West bus stop. Feda O'Donnell and Local Link both stop at the Tourist Office.

Developments
Development in Bundoran has been triggered by its popularity as a seaside destination and the availability of tax reliefs for the development of holiday homes. Thousands of music fans attend the Bundoran Sea Sessions Surf and Music Festival every June.

The Astoria Ballroom was built in 1953 at a time when dances were a major social activity, and showbands would entertain large crowds at the venue. Under the ownership of Brian McEniff, the venue had a number of facelifts and name changes and remained a landmark building. In November 2008, it was destroyed by fire.

In 2019 the town was announced as Failte Ireland's Destination Town for county Donegal paving the way for investment of €500,000 from the tourism development authority to enhance the town.

Education
On Railway Road stands the St Louis School, which was built in 1892. The buildings included a School and residence for the Sisters of St Louis. One of the buildings still stands today. Around the same time, the Sisters of St Louis had their secondary school beside the Old Grand Central Cinema in the premises known as The Sea View Hotel.

The St Joseph's orphanages were erected from funds bequeathed by the late Miss Sarah Crudden, Newtownbutler. These buildings later became known as Ard Lughaidh, much of the building was stone and also had a large sports and theatre hall all of which in 2006 the VEC demolished them. All that is left on the lands is the extension area used till the 1980s by 'live in' students of the Ard Lughaidh. This is now under the Donegal Adventure Centre ownership. Due to the decreasing class sizes in Ard Lughaigh in the 1990s the school faced closure and some students moved to Ballyshannon. Some of the St. Louis nuns moved to the St. Louis building at Railway Road, however, a lot moved away.

Sport

Surfing
Bundoran is noted as a surfing location and known as the Surf Capital of Ireland. Surfing locations include The Peak, Tullan Strand and nearby Rossnowlagh beach. The town hosted the European Surfing Championships in 1985 and again in 2011 and has been consistently named as the top beginner beach in Ireland by Red Bull Surf breaks in the town are suitable for beginners, intermediate and professionals.

Golf
There is an 18-hole golf course in Bundoran. The golf club was founded in 1894. The course is located on the historic Great Northern Railway Company site, the old railway sleepers encompass the Golf course which enjoys the most breathtaking and scenic views of the Atlantic Ocean. The course is a challenging experience despite its short length. Designed by Harry Vardon, the golf course is a testing 18 hole, Par 70. His design philosophy was “to give pleasure to golfers of all degrees”.

Gaelic games

In the 1920s the location of Bundoran on the railway line made the Bundoran local ground a convenient venue for many big games. The GAA club grounds were purchased in 1938. The club was reorganised and renamed Réalt na Mara, meaning "The Star of the Sea". The football park has undergone many developments throughout the years. The ground was levelled in 1947 and enclosed in 1951. The club changing rooms were constructed in 1972.

The juniors were successful in both the 1956 and 1960 Championships. In 1963, Réalt na Mara joined with Ballyshannon club Aodh Ruadh to become St Joseph's. That team included many players that contributed to the Donegal county team, including Brian McEniff and the former Donegal County Council Manager Michael McLoone. In 1977 the club was again divided into two clubs, one each for the towns of Bundoran and Ballyshannon.

In 1979, Bundoran beat Ballybofey in a nail-biting one-point victory to win the Senior Championship. Local man Brian McEniff led Donegal to the 1992 All-Ireland Senior Football Championship Final, in which they defeated Dublin in the final 0–18 to 0–14. Bundoran was the scene of enormous celebrations for almost a month afterwards.

In 2015, Réalt Na Mara won the Donegal Intermediate Football Championship title and went on to reach the Ulster final where they were defeated by Loughinisland.

Greyhound racing
A greyhound racing track was opened by the Bundoran Greyhound Racing Company Ltd in the town during October 1931. The construction cost was £800 in £1 shares and was set up by James Cassidy (cattle dealer) and John Conlan (merchant). The directors also included J.T.Flavin, D.Judge, P.Gorman and W.Hudson. On 21 December 1934 notice had been given that after three months the company would be dissolved but there is evidence that the track was still active or had re-opened during 1948.

Football
The International Football Association Board (IFAB), the body that determines the Laws of the Game, met at the Great Northern Hotel in Bundoran in 1909.

Notable people
 Sean McEniff (1936-2017) - businessman; Fianna Fáil politician
 Brian McEniff (born 1942) - Gaelic football player; Donegal manager
 Liam MacDaid (born 1945) - Bishop of Clogher
 Richie Fitzgerald, surfer
 Screaming Orphans, Celtic pop band

Bundoran in popular culture
The song "Beautiful Bundoran" was written  by Mai O'Higgins from Dungarvan, Waterford with the melody written by Bertie Flynn. It is believed that Mai had never actually been to Bundoran and had written the song from a brochure of Donegal. It has been covered by several artists most notably Kathleen Fitzgerald and the Fitzgerald Ceili Band, Jim Finnegan and Sinéad O'Connor for the film The Butcher Boy.

See also
 List of populated places in Ireland
 List of twin towns and sister cities in the Republic of Ireland
 List of RNLI stations
 Surfing in Ireland
 Wild Atlantic Way

References

External links
 
 Website of Bundoran Tourist Office

 
Beaches of County Donegal
Seaside resorts in the Republic of Ireland
Surfing locations in Ireland
Towns and villages in County Donegal